Quryug may refer to:
 Koruk Chutur
 Kuruk